The discography of Pansy Division, a San Francisco, California-based queercore band, consists of seven studio albums, five compilations and thirteen 7" singles, among other releases.

Studio albums

Compilation albums

7" singles and EPs

Split 7"

Compilation appearances
 "I Can't Sleep" on Outpunk Dance Party (Outpunk Records, 1992)
 "Homo Christmas" on Punk Rock Christmas (Rhino Records, 1995)
 "Ring of Joy" on A Slice Of Lemon (Lookout! Records, 1996)
 "Jackson" on Project: Echo (K Records, 1996)
 "Bunnies" on Stars Kill Rock (Kill Rock Stars, 1996)
 "Pillow Talk" on Team Mint (Mint Records, 1996)
 "The Summer You Let Your Hair Grow Out" on Heide Sez Lookout! (Lookout! Records, 1996)
 "Can't Make Love" (with Tré Cool) on Generations, Vol 1: A Punk Look at Human Rights (Ark 21 Records, 1997)
 "Loose" on We Will Fall: The Iggy Pop Tribute (Royalty Records, 1997)
 "Political Asshole" on The Last Great Thing You Did (Lookout! Records, 1997)
 "He Could Be The One" on Fer Shure: A Tribute to the Valley Girl Soundtrack (Itchy Korean Records, 1997)
 "Expiration Date" on Milkshake – A CD to Benefit the Harvey Milk Institute, (timmi-kat ReCoRDS, 1998)
 "Musclehead" on Forward 'Til Death: A Sampler Compilation (Lookout! Records, 1999)
 "Hockey Hair" on Puck Rock, Vol. 2 (Sudden Death Records, 2000)
 "The Summer You Let Your Hair Grow Out (Live)" on Songs for Summer (Oglio Records, 2000)
 "Used to Turn Me On (Demo)" on Lookout! Freakout (Lookout Records!, 2000)
 "Luv Luv Luv" on Bi the People: A Compilation of Bisexual Artists & Friends (Violent Yodel Records, 2003)
 "Luv Luv Luv" on Queer Stock Queer Soup (Queer Stock, 2003)
 "I Can Make You A Man" on The Rocky Horror Punk Rock Show (Springman Records, 2004)
 "Musclehead" on Plea for Peace, Vol. 2' (Asian Man Records, 2007)
 "You'll See Them Again" on Kat Vox: Celebrating 20 Years of timmi-kat ReCoRDS (timmi-kat ReCoRDS, 2011)

Soundtrack appearances
 "Deep Water" in Angus, directed by Patrick Read Johnson (1995)
 Queercore: A Punk-U-Mentary, directed by Scott Treleaven (1996)
 Skin & Bone, directed by Everett Lewis (1996)
 "Sweet Insecurity" and "Luv Luv Luv", Luster, directed by Everett Lewis (2002)
 "First Betrayal" in Hellbent,  directed by Paul Etheredge-Ouzts (2005)
 Pansy Division: Life In A Gay Rock Band'' (2008)

Videography

Video releases

Music videos

Discographies of American artists
Rock music group discographies